Junnardeo railway station serves Junnardeo in the Indian state of Madhya Pradesh.

History

Junnardeo is a part of the Nagpur–Chhindwara branch line, Chhindwara–Amla link and Satpura Railway. 
It's publicly opened in 1936.

Services

Trains departing from the Junnardeo railway station are:

Panchvalley Express
Patalkot Express
Chhindwara–Amritsar Chhattisgarh Express

References

Chhindwara
Railway stations in Madhya Pradesh
Transport in Madhya Pradesh